Atalik and Atalık are surnames of Turkish origin. People with those names include:

Ekaterina Atalik (born 1982), Russian-Turkish chess player
Suat Atalık (born 1964), Turkish/Bosnian chess grandmaster

See also
 Atalik Ghazi ('Champion Father'), a title of Yaqub Beg (1820-1877), adventurer of Tajik or Uzbek descent
 

Surnames of Turkish origin